The Canadian Society for Mass Spectrometry is an organization that promotes mass spectrometry in Canada. The goal of the society is to stimulate interest and collaborations in the Canadian mass spectrometry community. The society organizes conferences, awards prices and runs an online job board. The society is an affiliate society of the  International Mass Spectrometry Foundation. Its current president is Derek Wilson.

The society awards the annual Fred P. Lossing Award.

References

External links
 CSMS - Canadian Society for Mass Spectrometry

Chemistry education
Chemistry societies
Learned societies of Canada
Mass spectrometry
Science and technology in Canada
Scientific societies based in Canada